The Inch Man was a British television series which aired from 1951 to 1952 on the BBC. Starring Robert Ayres, it was a half-hour series broadcast live. All 14 episodes of the series are lost.

Premise
A drama about the house detective at a hotel.

Episode list
Series 1
That Sudden Something (aired 30 June 1951)
The Big Gamble (aired 7 July 1951)
Midnight Blues (aired 14 July 1951)
Wedding Night (aired 21 July 1951)
Night Shift (aired 28 July 1951)
Moments So Few (aired 4 August 1951)

Series 2
Coming Out Party (aired 8 December 1951)
Badger Game (aired 15 December 1951)
Cocktail Hour (aired 22 December 1951)
I Hate Christmas (aired 29 December 1951)
Cloak and Dagger (aired 5 January 1952)
Private View (aired 12 January 1952)
Title Fight (aired 19 January 1952)
The Quiet Voice (aired 26 January 1952)

References

External links

1951 British television series debuts
1952 British television series endings
1950s British drama television series
English-language television shows
British live television series
Lost television shows
BBC television dramas
Black-and-white British television shows